Vasili Pavlovich Ponomaryov (born 13 March 2002) is a Russian professional ice hockey player for the Chicago Wolves of the American Hockey League (AHL) as a prospect for the Carolina Hurricanes of the National Hockey League (NHL).

Playing career
Ponomaryov was drafted ninth overall by the Shawinigan Cataractes in the 2019 CHL Import Draft. During his rookie season in 2019–20, he recorded 18 goals and 31 assists in 57 games for the Cataractes. During the 2020–21 season, he recorded 10 goals and 28 assists in 33 games.

Ponomaryov was drafted in the second round, 53rd overall, by the Carolina Hurricanes in the 2020 NHL Entry Draft. On 13 October 2020, the Hurricanes signed Ponomaryov to a three-year, entry-level contract. On 9 June 2021, the Hurricanes loaned Ponomarev to the HC Spartak Moscow of the KHL. He made his professional debut for Spartak during the 2021–22 season.

International play
Ponomaryov represented Russia at the 2017 World U-17 Hockey Challenge where he led the team in scoring with four goals and four assists in six games and won a gold medal. In 2019 he represented Russia at the 2019 Hlinka Gretzky Cup where he recorded two goals and three assists in five games and won a gold medal and the 2019 World Junior A Challenge where he recorded one goal and three assists in six games and won a gold medal.

He represented Russia at the 2021 World Junior Championships where he led the team in scoring with three goals in seven games. He also played at the 2022 World Juniors, where he played two games before the tournament was cancelled.

Career statistics

Regular season and playoffs

International

Awards and honors

References

External links

2002 births
Living people
Carolina Hurricanes draft picks
Chicago Wolves players
Ice hockey people from Moscow
HC Spartak Moscow players
JHC Spartak players
Krylya Sovetov Moscow players
Shawinigan Cataractes players
Russian ice hockey centres